Northeast Township is one of twenty-two townships in Adams County, Illinois, United States.  As of the 2010 census, its population was 840 and it contained 398 housing units.

Geography

Cities
 Golden (vast majority)
 La Prairie

Cemeteries
The township contains four cemeteries: Leenerts, Memorial Gardens, Mount Horeb and Walker.

Airports and landing strips
 Robbins Landing Strip

Demographics
As of the 2020 census there were 836 people, 426 households, and 254 families residing in the township. The racial makeup of the township was 94.62% White, 0.12% African American, 0.24% Native American, 0.84% Asian, 0.00% Pacific Islander, 0.36% from other races, and 3.83% from two or more races. Hispanic or Latino of any race were 1.67% of the population.

There were 426 households, out of which 31.90% had children under the age of 18 living with them, 46.24% were married couples living together, 12.21% had a female householder with no spouse present, and 40.38% were non-families. 38.00% of all households were made up of individuals, and 26.80% had someone living alone who was 65 years of age or older. The average household size was 2.09 and the average family size was 2.72.

The township's age distribution consisted of 21.0% under the age of 18, 4.8% from 18 to 24, 20.9% from 25 to 44, 22.6% from 45 to 64, and 30.8% who were 65 years of age or older. The median age was 47.5 years. For every 100 females, there were 109.7 males. For every 100 females age 18 and over, there were 90.9 males.

The median income for a household in the township was $56,563, and the median income for a family was $76,667. Males had a median income of $40,000 versus $30,658 for females. The per capita income for the township was $29,932. About 8.3% of families and 12.4% of the population were below the poverty line, including 11.7% of those under age 18 and 19.7% of those age 65 or over.

School districts
 Camp Point Community Unit School District 3
 Southeastern Community Unit School District 337

Political districts
 Illinois' 18th congressional district
 State House District 93
 State Senate District 47

References
 
 United States Census Bureau 2007 TIGER/Line Shapefiles
 United States National Atlas

External links
 List of Adams County township trustees
 City-Data.com
 Illinois State Archives

Townships in Adams County, Illinois
1849 establishments in Illinois
Townships in Illinois